According to the Act on Protection of Nature (Ustawa o ochronie przyrody) of 2004, a Landscape Park (Parki Krajobrazowe) is defined as "an area protected because of its natural, historical, cultural and scenic values, for the purpose of conserving and popularizing those values in conditions of balanced development."

Decisions on the creation, liquidation and boundaries of Landscape Parks are taken by resolution of the provincial assembly (voivodeship sejmik). A decision to create a Landscape Park must be preceded by consultation with the council of any relevant gmina and with the Regional Director of Nature Protection. A buffer zone (otulina) may be designated in addition to the area of the Park itself.

They are listed here with their English and Polish names and with the names of the voivodeships in which they are situated.

Notes

 
Poland
Landscape parks